The 2007–08 Boston College Eagles men's ice hockey season was the 86th season of play for the program and 24th in the Hockey East. They represented Boston College in the 2007–08 NCAA Division I men's ice hockey season. They were coached by Jerry York, in his 14th season and played their home games at the Conte Forum. The team won the 2008 NCAA Division I men's ice hockey tournament, the 3rd title in program history.

Season
After losing the national championship in the final minutes a year before, Boston College entered the year with a good deal of hope but also some uncertainty. 3-year starter, Cory Schneider forwent his senior season by signing a professional contract and BC would have to rely on three underclassmen to absorb the minutes. Fortunately, with the entire defensive corps returning, the young netminders would be insulated by a solid contingent. Up front the team lost their leading scorer from the year before, Brian Boyle but still returned most of the principle offense.

Injury and suspensions
With all the elements for a solid season, the Eagles were ranked high in the preseason polls. While they kicked off the year with an overtime loss to Michigan, much worse was to come in the aftermath. Brock Bradford, one of the team's leading point producers from last year, suffered a broken arm and would be out for months.  Compounding their problems, Brett Motherwell and Brian O'Hanley, two of the leaders on defense, were given indefinite suspensions by head coach Jerry York. While the team was mum on the entire reason behind the suspensions, other than saying that the two had missed curfew, York indicated in November that neither would be back with the team 'any time soon'. As a result, both players ended up leaving the team and signing professional contracts during the year. The Eagles also lost a 4th player early in the year when freshman Ryan Hayes departed after just 6 games.

In the meantime, BC had to struggle through the early part of the season without three of its expected regulars. York had to shuffle his lineup and throw some of his newer players into the deep end of the pool. Surprisingly, it was the defense that held up best over the next several weeks. The biggest boon came from in goal where freshman John Muse took complete control of the starting role and kept the Eagles in contention for most games. Unfortunately, the offense was lacking without Bradford and by the Thanksgiving break, BC had both more losses and more ties than victories and had dropped out of both polls.

Resurgence and reinjury
A change to the lines just before the break appeared to work well and when the team returned in late November, the unit of Nathan Gerbe, Brian Gibbons and Ben Smith began to take over. The Eagles won their next five matches, averaging more than six goals per game over that stretch. After their winning streak was snapped by Clarkson, the Eagles welcomed Bradford back to the lineup on January 9. He replaced Smith on the top line and earned a point in each of his next four games. In the second period of the game at Boston University on January 19, Bradford broke his left humerus for a second time. While surgery was not required, he was ruled out for the remainder of the season.

Smith rejoined the top line and BC continued to plug along despite the pall cast over the club. BC had a tough fight on its hands when it met for the 56th edition of the Beanpot. The Eagles got behind 2–3 to BU but a pair of goals from Gerbe, the second coming in overtime, sent BC to the championship game. Boston College faced Harvard in front of a raucous crowd and held a 1-goal lead going into the third. The two combined for 5 goals in the final frame, and ended up tied at 5-all at the end of 60 minutes. BC completely dominated the overtime session, outshooting the Crimson 7–0. Freshman Nick Petrecki became an instant hero for BC by scoring twice, including the game-winner, and giving the program its first Beanpot victory in 4 years.

Slumping after the Beanpot
After the tournament victory, the offense for Boston College suddenly went silent. The Eagles went 1–5–1 over their next seven games and scored more than 2 goals in just one contest. The mounting losses put the Eagles in jeopardy of missing out on the postseason if they performed poorly in the Hockey East Tournament. As they began their postseason the Eagles were lumped in with teams with inferior records. Because both the CCHA and WCHA were considered to be stronger conferences, Boston College could not afford to flame out in their conference tournament.

Hockey East Tournament
Due in part to their late-season slump, Boston College opened the postseason against a ranked Providence team. BC got off to tremendous starts in both matches, scoring the four four goals in each contest and easily downing the Friars. While Gerbe scored twice in each contest, it was Muse's 68 saves that were the highlight for the series. The wins sent BC to the semifinal against league champion New Hampshire, who had swept BC in their season series. At the start it appeared that the Wildcats were going to go four for four when they jumped out to a 2–0 lead after one period. Ben Smith cut into the advantage but UNH followed that with two more goals, one on the penalty kill, to take a commanding 4–1 lead past the midway point of the game. BC redoubled its efforts and ended up firing 24 shots on the Wildcat goal in the second, managing to score twice more before the end of the frame to give them a fighting chance. A goal by Dan Bertram tied the score early in the third which is when both goaltenders took over. Both Muse and Kevin Regan stopped every shot for the next 55 minutes and pushed the game into a third overtime. 43 seconds into the 6th period, Benn Ferriero ended the match with his 16th goal of the season.

Despite the potential hangover from the extended game, BC romped over an upstart Vermont squad in the final. BC repeated as tournament champions and earned the conference's automatic bid to the NCAA tournament.

NCAA Tournament
Despite winning the conference championship, BC's record only earned them a 2nd seed for the Northeast Regional. Ben Smith kicked off the scoring for the Eagles in their first game in the opening period. After exchanging goals with Minnesota in the second, Boston College built a 4–1 lead in the third with scoring from their depth lines. The Gophers pulled their goaltender with 3:40 left after they got on the power play and cut into BC's lead. Muse held the fort afterwards and an empty-net goal from Gerbe salted the game away.

The biggest test for the Eagles was awaiting them in the regional final. #2 overall seed Miami, who had spent much of the year ranked #1, was a tournament favorite and lived up to their billing early in the game. The RedHawks opened the scoring  just 90 seconds into the game but were held in check by BC's defense for the remainder of the period. Miami doubled their advantage midway through the second and appeared to be heading towards a victory. On a delayed penalty, BC pulled Muse and they were able to parlay the impromptu 6-on-5 into their first goal of the night. Just 14 seconds after the ensuing faceoff, Nathan Gerbe scored to tie the game. A minute and a half after that, Ben Smith gave BC their first lead of the game. The stunning turnaround put BC in the driver seat and kept the team's championship drive alive. While Miami tied the game in the third, neither team could get the winner before the buzzer sounded and BC headed to its 14th overtime game of the season. While BC may have been old hands at extra hockey, it was Miami who shelled the BC cage. Muse turned aside 10 shots in 12 minutes of game action and gave his team enough time to capitalize on their chances. A sprawled-out Joe Whitney swiped a rebound past Jeff Zatkoff to send BC to their third consecutive frozen four.

Compared to their quarterfinal game, BC's match against North Dakota was less than thrilling. The Eagles scored four times in the opening frame and added two more in the second to take an almost insurmountable lead over the Fighting Sioux. Gerbe recorded a hat-trick to raise his total on the season to 33 and take over as the national leader  in both goals and points. After the rather pedestrian 6–1 win, BC only had Notre Dame remaining in their path.

In the final game of the season, Boston College got off to a slow start but the first period ended up with just 12 shots combined. Notre Dame was only able to get the puck on goal 5 times despite having three separate power plays. While the Irish couldn't capitalize on their opportunities, BC took full advantage in the second, scoring twice on the man-advantage and adding a third at even strength to build a 3–0 lead. Notre Dame managed to score one of their own but BC's defense held and stopped the Fighting Irish from doing any more scoring for the remainder of the game. Smith netted the only marker of the third and the Eagles skated to a fairly comfortable victory, earning the third NCAA championship in program history.

With his hat-trick in the semifinal and contributing on every goal in the championship, Nathan Gerbe was the obvious choice for Tournament MOP.

Recruiting 
Boston College added five freshmen for the 2007–2008 season, including one defenseman, two forwards, and two goalies.

2007–2008 Roster

Departures from 2006–2007 Team 

 Brian Boyle, F – Graduation
 Joe Rooney, F – Graduation
 Justin Greene, F – Graduation
 Corey Griffin, F – left team
 Joseph Ehiorobo, F – left team
 Brett Motherwell, D – dismissed midseason
 Brian O'Hanley, D – dismissed midseason
 Adam Reasoner, G – left team
 Cory Schneider, G – signed with VAN

2007–2008 Eagles

Standings

Schedule and results

|-
!colspan=12 ! style=""; | 

|-
!colspan=12 ! style=""; | Regular Season

|-
!colspan=12 ! style=""; | 

|-
!colspan=12 ! style=""; | 

|-
!colspan=12 style=";" | 

|-
!colspan=12 style=";" | 

^ Game shortened to 2 periods due to poor ice conditions.

2008 national championship

Scoring statistics

Goaltending statistics

Rankings

Note: USCHO did not release a poll in weeks 1, 9, 25, or 26, USA Today did not release a poll in week 12.

Awards and honors

Players drafted into the NHL

2008 NHL Entry Draft

† incoming freshman

References 

2007–08
Boston College Eagles
Boston College Eagles
Boston College
Boston College
Boston College Eagles men's ice hockey season
Boston College Eagles men's ice hockey season
Boston College Eagles men's ice hockey season
Boston College Eagles men's ice hockey season